, born as , was a Japanese singer, lyricist, and composer.

Biography 
On the music program Hey! Hey! Hey! Music Champ, he mentioned he composed two songs at the age of 11 – Heart of a Woman and Northern Town.

In 1984, Takahashi started his work entering the band Popsicle. In 1987, he joined the band Tulip (Japanese article), beginning a more professional musical career. He played a major role in the band's development, writing some of its hit singles.

In 1989, after the breakup of Tulip (Reunited in 1997), he rejoined Popsicle temporarily.

When his recording label shut down, he became more active as a composer. He composed numerous soundtracks for anime, stage, television, and radio. The music for the program Nippon Hoso Show Up Nighta was also his work from 2005 until 2008.

He died on November 4, 2005, at the age of 41, due to multiple organ failure resulting from a retroperitoneal sarcoma.

Discography

Albums
  (November 19, 1993)
 Welcome To Popsicle Channel (November 18, 1994)
 New Horizon (November 17, 1995)
 Great Big Kiss (November 11, 2000)
 From Future Present (February/March, 2007)
 Takahashi Hiro Best Collection (March 15, 2010 – PCCS.00091)

Singles
  (November 19, 1993)
  (December 17, 1993)
  (February 18, 1994)
  (June 17, 1994)
  (June 21, 1995)
  (November 1, 1995)
 Soda Fountain (October 1, 1998)
  (March 23, 2002)
  (September 16, 2002)
  (singer: Matsuko Mawatari)/Unbalance na Kiss o shite/Taiyō Ga Mata Kagayaku Toki (June 1, 2005) – Re-recorded version

References

External links 
 Oricon profile (Japanese)
 

1964 births
2005 deaths
20th-century Japanese composers
20th-century Japanese male singers
20th-century Japanese singers
Deaths from cancer in Japan
Deaths from multiple organ failure
Japanese male composers
Japanese male singer-songwriters
Japanese male pop singers
Singers from Tokyo